Flinthook is platform game roguelike by Tribute Games in which the player's character uses a grappling hook to traverse procedurally generated spaceships for treasure. The developers were inspired by "rogue-lites" including Spelunky and Rogue Legacy. They said that the grappling hook game mechanic was their hardest design challenge. The game was released in April 2017 for Windows, macOS, Linux, PlayStation 4, and Xbox One, followed by a release for Nintendo Switch in March 2018. Early previews of Flinthook noted the accessibility and tightness of the controls. Digital Trends and Kotaku listed the game among the best in show at the June 2016 Electronic Entertainment Expo.

Gameplay 

Flinthook is a roguelike platform game in which the player controls a masked space pirate who explores procedurally generated ships for treasure with a grappling chain hook. Captain Flinthook, the player-character, also has a plasma gun and the ability to slow time. The hook is used on environmental elements as well as enemies. For example, some enemies are invulnerable until the player removes their armor via the hook. The player uses the left analog stick to both control the player and aim the hook. The hook is activated via the controller's trigger, and face buttons make the character jump, shoot, throw bombs and interact with nearby objects. The game's level design and room contents are randomly generated, such that a room might look familiar but contain different enemies. The player unlocks different bounties to hunt down, and must start a chapter over from the beginning upon their character's death. The game is depicted in pixel art.

Development 

Tribute Games is an indie development studio based in Montreal that previously worked on Mercenary Kings. In November 2015, the game's designer, Dominique Ferland, polled his contacts on Twitter about their interest in "Spiderman with a gun" as a game concept. Tribute Games co-founder Jean-François Major said that perfecting the feel of the grappling hook was the team's hardest challenge. The game was inspired by other "rogue-lite" games, such as Spelunky and Rogue Legacy, though the team did not design their game to be exceptionally difficult for all players. Less than a month after the release of Ninja Senki DX, Tribute announced Flinthook in March 2016 with a mosaic teaser on Twitch. The game's procedural generation was working in the office Windows version of the game at the time of announcement, though their demo used a predetermined level. Limited Run Games released a physical edition of the game for PlayStation 4 on April 14, 2017, with a production run of 4,500 copies. A digital version published by Tribute Games released for Windows, macOS, Linux, PlayStation 4, and Xbox One on April 18, 2017. A digital version for Nintendo Switch was released on March 9, 2018.

Reception 

Digital Trends listed the game among the best in show at the June 2016 Electronic Entertainment Expo and added that though many major games were adding grappling hook features, Flinthook was the only one to support a whole game based on the concept. The website praised the game's "imaginative artwork and refined, fun gameplay". Nick Robinson (Polygon) wrote that the game's controls were "enormously intuitive", easily accessible, and comfortable.

The game received "generally favorable" reviews, according to video game review aggregator Metacritic. Rock, Paper, Shotgun included it among the year's best action games.

Notes

References

External links 

 

2017 video games
Indie video games
Platform games
Roguelike video games
Single-player video games
Tribute Games games
Xbox One games
Video games about pirates
Video games developed in Canada
Windows games
PlayStation 4 games
Nintendo Switch games